Black Feminist Anthropology: Theory, Politics, Praxis, and Poetics is a 2001 collection of essays from nine black feminist anthropologists. The book was edited by Irma McClaurin, who also wrote the collection's foreword and one of the essays. It was first published on 1 August 2001 through Rutgers University Press and focuses on the essay writers' personal experiences as black women in the world and how that influenced their anthropological practices.

Content
Introduction: Forging a Theory, Politics, Prazis, and Poetics of Black Feminist Anthropology by Irma McClaurin
Seeking the Ancestors: Forging A Black Feminist Tradition in Anthropology by Lynn Bolles
Theorizing a Black Feminist Self in Anthropology: Toward an Autoethnographic Approach by Irma McClaurin
A Passion for Sameness: Encountering A Black Feminist Self in Fieldwork in the Dominican Republic by Kimberly Eison Simmons
Disciplining the Black Female Body: Learning Feminism in Africa and the United States by Carolyn Martin Shaw
Negotiating Identity and Black Feminist Politics in Caribbean Research by Karla Slocum
A Black Feminist Perspective on the Sexual Commodification of Women in the New Global Culture by Angela M. Gilliam
Biomedical Ethics, Gender, and Ethnicity: Implications for Black Feminist Anthropology by Cheryl Mwaria
Contingent Stories of Anthropology, Race, and Feminism by Paulla A. Ebron
A Homegirl Goes Home: Black Feminism and the Lure of Native Anthropology by Cheryl Rodriguez

Reception
Critical reception for Black Feminist Anthropology has largely been positive, for example:
 Marla Fredrick's review in Contemporary Sociology.
 Choice Reviews Online praised the work, stating it was a "refreshing and inspiring collection of nine articles and a superb introduction seeks to come to terms with, if not resolve, the triple contradictions found in the title."
 Yolanda T. Moses of Anthropological Quarterly also  praised Black Feminist Anthropology, stating that it was "a very important and provocative book".

Another reviewer, for American Anthropologist, was somewhat critical of the work, commenting that he would have liked to have seen more information and discussion in the book, using Karla Slocum's conversational interview style as an example and stated that she did not
explain whether it mattered that she was not, in fact, a market woman who had to compete with her informants in the marketplace, nor did she have to survive on the proceeds of her labor there. Like her professional colleagues, she chose to be a participant-observer and could choose to terminate the experiment at will."

References

2001 non-fiction books
Anthropology books